Cape Apostolos Andreas ("Cape Saint Andrew"; , "Cape Victory") is the north-easternmost point (promontory) of the Mediterranean island of Cyprus. It lies at the tip of the finger-like Karpass Peninsula.

The Apostolos Andreas Monastery is located 5 km southwest of the promontory itself.

Herodotus mentions it as "Keys of Cyprus", where the Phoenicians were sailing with their ships in a war between Darius I and the Ionians.

References

Apostolos Andreas
Landforms of Northern Cyprus